Royce Cullen Womble (August 12, 1931 – November 30, 2016) was an American football running back who played in the National Football League (NFL) and the American Football League (AFL). He played five seasons for the NFL's Baltimore Colts and the AFL's Los Angeles Chargers. He died from complications of Alzheimer's disease in 2016.

References

1931 births
2016 deaths
People from Webb County, Texas
Players of American football from Texas
American football running backs
North Texas Mean Green football players
Baltimore Colts players
Los Angeles Chargers players